Ignite Entertainment is an American film production company. It was developed from the film producing arm of the Hollywood Stock Exchange (HSX), and formally created by Leanna Creel and Michael Burns. In 1999, Creel left the company and Scott Bernstein joined as vice president. Ignite's films include But I'm a Cheerleader (1999), Get Over It (2001) and 2009's Shrink.

Filmography
 1998: Dancer, Texas Pop. 81 (as HSX Films)
 1998: Girl (as HSX Films)
 1998: Possums (as HSX Films)
 1998: Desert Blue
 1998: Six-String Samurai (as HSX Films)
 1999: Night Deposit
 1999: The Suburbans
 1999: But I'm a Cheerleader
 2001: Get Over It
 2003: Confidence
 2006: Lost Behind Bars
 2007: A Valentine Carol
 2007: Destination: Infestation
 2007: Devil's Diary
 2008: Storm Seekers
 2008: Making Mr. Right
 2009: Shrink

References

Film production companies of the United States
Companies based in Los Angeles